Lepidonectes bimaculatus, known commonly as the twinspot triplefin, is a species of triplefin blenny in the genus Lepidonectes. It was described by Gerald R. Allen and David Ross Robertson in 1992. This species is found in the eastern Pacific Ocean where it has been recorded only in the vicinity of Malpelo Island in Colombia. The twinspot triplefin acts as a cleaner fish, its only client species being the grouper Epinephelus labriformis.

References

Twinspot triplefin
Fish described in 1992